The Tri-Cities are an informal grouping of the three adjacent suburban cities of Coquitlam, Port Coquitlam, and Port Moody, along with the two villages of Anmore and Belcarra in the northeast sector of Metro Vancouver in British Columbia. Combined, these five communities have a 2016 population of 234,300 residents:

Demographics

Other terms
When referring to schools, residents commonly refer to the Tri-Cities as "District 43," after the public school district that serves this area.

Media
The Tri-Cities area has access to a wide variety of media available in the Lower Mainland. After Glacier Community Media merged several community newspapers, only one remains: the Tri-City News.

CKPM-FM in Port Moody became the first radio station dedicated to the Tri-Cities area when it took to the air in 2011.

Transportation

Roads
For motorists, the Trans-Canada Highway provides freeway access to Burnaby, Vancouver, Surrey, and other municipalities in the Lower Mainland. Lougheed Highway is an alternative route to the Trans-Canada, entering Coquitlam through Maillardville, past the Riverview Hospital area, up to Coquitlam Centre where it turns sharply east to Port Coquitlam and then into Pitt Meadows via the Pitt River Bridge. Barnet Highway begins at the Coquitlam Centre area and heads directly west through Port Moody and on to Burnaby and downtown Vancouver.

Public transit
Bus service in the Tri-Cities is provided by TransLink. The West Coast Express, which runs from Downtown Vancouver to Mission, stops at Port Coquitlam station, Coquitlam Central station and Moody Centre station.

SkyTrain currently serves the area, since the completion of the Evergreen Extension on December 2, 2016. The line serves Lougheed Town Centre in Burnaby, and passes through the southwestern part of Coquitlam into Port Moody and central Coquitlam, where it terminates at Lafarge Lake–Douglas station.

Business
Businesses in the Tri-City area are represented by the Tri-Cities Chamber of Commerce.

Anmore
Belcarra
Geography of Coquitlam
Port Coquitlam
Port Moody